Isabelle Sambou (born 20 October 1980, in Mlomp Haer) is a Senegalese freestyle wrestler. She competed in the freestyle 48 kg event at the 2012 Summer Olympics; she advanced to the bronze medal match, where she was defeated by Carol Huynh.

At the 2016 Summer Olympics, she competed in the freestyle 53 kg event. She defeated Nguyen Thi Lua  of Vietnam in the first round. She was then defeated by eventual silver medalist, Saori Yoshida of Japan during the quarterfinals. Sambou was defeated by eventual bronze medalist, Natalya Synyshyn of Azerbaijan in the repechage. She was the flagbearer for Senegal during the opening ceremony.

References

External links
 

1980 births
Living people
Senegalese female sport wrestlers
Olympic wrestlers of Senegal
Wrestlers at the 2012 Summer Olympics
Wrestlers at the 2016 Summer Olympics
African Games silver medalists for Senegal
African Games medalists in wrestling
Competitors at the 2015 African Games
20th-century Senegalese women
21st-century Senegalese women